Thomas Lawson Clough (1 January 1926 – April 2008) was an English cricketer. Clough was a right-handed batsman who fielded occasionally as a wicket-keeper. He was born in Lynesack, County Durham and known by his nickname Laurie.

Clough made his debut Hertfordshire in the 1954 Minor Counties Championship against Cambridgeshire. He played Minor counties cricket for Hertfordshire from 1954 to 1971, making 89 Minor Counties Championship appearances. He made his List A debut for the county against Durham in the 1964 Gillette Cup. He made four further List A appearances for the county, the last of which came against Surrey in the 1971 Gillette Cup. In his five List A matches, he scored 112 runs at an average of 22.40, with a high score of 47.

He died in April 2008.

References

External links
Laurie Clough at ESPNcricinfo
Laurie Clough at CricketArchive

1926 births
2008 deaths
People from County Durham (district)
Cricketers from County Durham
English cricketers
Hertfordshire cricketers